Thomas Darnell (February 2, 1958) is an American artist known for his oil paintings of figurative landscapes and flowers, and abstracts.

French newspaper L'Indépendant describes his work as being influenced by modern painters Gerhard Richter and Ross Bleckner, but also by Caravaggio and Rembrandt.

Life and work 
Darnell and his second wife live in France, Darnell himself having initially moved to Paris in 1991 and subsequently to the South of France, however he exhibits internationally. His work has been featured in multiple international publications, including Taiwanese design magazine ppapaer, Australian journal The Cool Hunter, Moco Loco, American design and lifestyle magazine Atlanta Homes Brigitte (Germany's largest women's magazine), Artful Living Magazine, Spanish design magazine El Mueble and monthly British fashion magazine Tatler.

Darnell was initially drawn to paint seriously after the death of his first wife. Throughout the 1990s, Darnell exhibited in New York City in SoHo and Tribeca He has also exhibited in Hong Kong, Singapore, Korea, Argentina, and Europe. He exhibited in Barcelona in 2016.

During a 1995 exhibition at the Fernando Alcolea Gallery in Barcelona, a writeup in El País described his work as being "painted with an extreme manual dexterity, something, on the one hand, typical of North American painters, based in the Leonardesque principle suggesting innumerable images starting with stains and in this case, effects of luminosity." The article went on to state "Occasionally, it reflects a mystic atmosphere by means of diffused forms which resemble clouds, other times, suggesting hollow waves, or on the contrary, lights more recognizable closer to candles." Like L'independant, it compared his technique with that of Richter, and his preoccupation with light to that of Bleckner, but also referred to him as an echo of German Romantic landscape painter Caspar David Friedrich.

References

External links 
 ThomasDarnell.com
 Flowers by Thomas Darnell

Living people
Artists from Austin, Texas
21st-century American painters
20th-century American painters
University of Texas at Austin alumni
1958 births
Artists from San Antonio
Abstract painters
American contemporary painters
American landscape painters
American Impressionist painters